Lycée Camille Sée may refer to:
 Lycée Camille-Sée in Paris
 Lycée Camille Sée in Colmar